Philotheca angustifolia, commonly known as narrow-leaf wax flower, is a species of flowering plant in the family Rutaceae and is endemic to south-eastern Australia. It is a shrub with small leaves and white flowers with five egg-shaped petals in spring.

Description
There are ten stamens each with a small white appendage on the anther, the stamens nearer the sepals with an awl-shaped tip.

Taxonomy and naming
Narrow-leaf wax flower was first formally described in 1970 by Paul Wilson who gave it the name Eriostemon angustifolius and published the description in the journal Nuytsia. The type specimen was collected in the lower Mount Lofty Ranges by Darrell Kraehenbuehl. In 1998 Wilson transferred the species to the genus Philotheca as P. angustifolia.

In 1970, Wilson described also described two subspecies of Eriostemon angustifolius, subspecies angustifolius and subspecies montanus. The subspecies were also transferred to Philotheca and the names have been accepted by the Australian Plant Census:

Distribution and habitat
Narrow-leaf wax flower grows in open woodland and mallee. Subspecies angustifolia occurs in central Victoria and in south-eastern South Australia. There is a single record from 1882 in southern New South Wales. Subspecies montana only occurs in mountainous areas in western Victoria.

References

angustifolia
Flora of New South Wales
Flora of South Australia
Flora of Victoria (Australia)
Sapindales of Australia
Plants described in 1970
Taxa named by Paul G. Wilson